Gustavo José Joaquín Noboa Bejarano (21 August 1937 – 16 February 2021) was an Ecuadorian politician. He served as the 42nd president of Ecuador from 22 January 2000 to 15 January 2003. Previously he served as the vice president during Jamil Mahuad's government from 1998 until 2000. From 1983 until 1984, he also was the Governor of the province of Guayas.

Political career 
Noboa was governor of Guayas Province from March 1983 to August 1984. In the 1998 presidential elections he was the running mate of Jamil Mahuad, who won. He was sworn in as Vice President of Ecuador on 10 August 1998.

Presidency (2000–2003) 
On 21 January 2000, a military coup deposed Mahuad's government and the following day Noboa became President of Ecuador in constitutional order.

Noboa's presidency was marked by attempts to revive the Ecuadorian economy, which was in a recession at the time, including the freeing of US$400 million worth of assets frozen by the previous government. He left office in 2003 after Lucio Gutiérrez was elected president in the 2002 presidential election. Noboa's presidency became notable for restoring the country's economy.

Controversy 
Noboa was accused of mishandling the country's foreign debt by the former president, León Febres Cordero.

After his term ended, accusations of irregularities in foreign debt negotiation that cost the country $9 billion dollars were levelled at the former president. He completely denied the charges and applied for political asylum in the Dominican Republic, which was granted on 11 August 2003.

The Supreme Court case against him was annulled by an unconstitutional, yet functioning, Supreme Court on the grounds that the case was not initiated by a two-thirds congressional vote as the Constitution stipulates. However, he was placed under house arrest in May 2005 and Ecuador's Interior Minister planned to prosecute. On 16 March 2006, a Supreme Court judge lifted the detention order and charged Noboa with being an accessory after the fact.

Personal life 
Noboa was born in Guayaquil. He studied political and social sciences and obtained a Doctor in Law from the University of Guayaquil. He was chancellor of the University from 1986 until 1996 and also taught law there. He was 83.

Noboa died on 16 February 2021 after suffering a heart attack while in recovery from surgery for a brain tumor at Jackson Memorial Hospital in Miami, Florida.

References

External links 
 Biography by CIDOB 

1937 births
2021 deaths
Presidents of Ecuador
Vice presidents of Ecuador
Governors of Guayas Province
People from Guayaquil
Christian Democratic Union (Ecuador) politicians
Ecuadorian politicians convicted of crimes
Heads of government who were later imprisoned
 Deaths from cancer in Florida